St. Isidore (formerly known as St. Isidore de Prescott) is a community in The Nation Municipality in Prescott and Russell County in Ontario, Canada.

The town was originally called St. Isidore de Prescott, but in 1989, when the community became an incorporated village, the name was shortened to St. Isidore. However, the incorporated village was short-lived and became part of The Nation Municipality nine years later in 1998. St-Isidore has a French elementary school (Kindergarten to 6) called  L'école Catholique de St-Isidore . The school has between 200 and 300 students.

A designated place, St. Isidore had a population of 751 in the Canada 2006 Census.

A 24 megawatt solar power plant is located near the town.

The St-Isidore Catholic Church, built in 1879 was destroyed by fire on July 23, 2016.

Demographics 

Population in 2011:  752
Population in 2006:  751
Total private dwellings:  330
Land area (square km):  1.15
Population density per square km:  652.4
Median age of the population:  45.1
Total number of occupied private dwellings by structural type of dwelling: 315
Single-detached house: 225
Other dwelling: 15
Apartment, duplex:  10
Apartment, building that has fewer than five storeys:  55

People from St. Isidore 
 Royal Galipeau - politician
 Valérie Grenier - Canadian alpine ski racer who competed in the 2018 Winter Olympics 
 Benoît Pouliot - professional ice hockey player
 Francis Wathier - professional ice hockey player

References

Former villages in Ontario
Communities in the United Counties of Prescott and Russell
Designated places in Ontario